CASMEET is a mnemonic acronym used by emergency medical services to communicate the important details of a patient over to an emergency control centre,  receiving hospital, or other definitive care provider. A CASMEET message can be sent in order to pre-alert a receiving emergency department that a critically ill patient is being brought in. It can be used as an alternative to ASHICE.

Meaning of the acronym
The acronym is used to pass all the most vital details of the patient to the receiving hospital in order to ensure staff have all the appropriate equipment and staff assembled and prepared.
Callsign of the vehicle/unit responding
Age — patient's age
Sex — whether the patient is male or female
Mechanism/Mode — the mechanism of injury or the mode of illness
Examination — the clinical findings from the initial assessment of the patient
ETA — estimated time of arrival
Treatment — any treatment that has already been provided

Other uses
CASMEET can also be used when handing over a patient from one level of pre-hospital care to another -- for example, from first responder to paramedic.

References

Medical mnemonics
Mnemonic acronyms